= UC Press =

UC Press may refer to:

- University of California Press
- University of Chicago Press
